Dillon is an unincorporated community in Phelps County, in the U.S. state of Missouri. The community is located along the BNSF railroad line between Rolla and St. James.

History
A post office called Dillon was established in 1861, and remained in operation until 1954. The community has the name of John A. Dillon, an early citizen.

References

Unincorporated communities in Phelps County, Missouri
Unincorporated communities in Missouri